In New Zealand an ecological district is defined as a particular geographical region that has a characteristic landscape and range of biological communities. They were developed after a need was seen for Protected Natural Areas.

List
Initially 268 ecological districts within 85 ecological regions were defined. At a later stage there was a reallocation of some of the ecological districts.

See also
Environment of New Zealand
Conservation in New Zealand

References

External links
Ecological regions and districts at the Ministry for the Environment